Lanceopenna is a genus of moths in the family Gelechiidae.

Species
 Lanceopenna pentastigma Janse, 1960
 Lanceopenna prominula (Meyrick, 1913)
 Lanceopenna pseudogaleotis Janse, 1950

References

Gelechiinae